is a Shingon-sect Buddhist temple in the Aono neighborhood of the city of Ōgaki, Gifu, Japan. It is one of the few surviving provincial temples established by Emperor Shōmu during the Nara period (710 – 794). Due to this connection, the foundation stones of the Nara period temple now located to the south of the present day complex were designated as a National Historic Site in 1916.

History
These temples were built to a semi-standardized template, and served both to spread Buddhist orthodoxy to the provinces, and to emphasize the power of the Nara period centralized government under the Ritsuryō system.

The Mino Kokubun-ji is located in western Gifu Prefecture, a short distance to the west of the present-day downtown of Ōgaki. The location was near the ichinomiya of Mino Province, the Nangū Taisha, the Hiruiōzuka Kofun and the ruins of the Mino Provincial Capital. The exact date of the temple's foundation is unknown; but is believed that work started around 741 AD and was completed by the 750s.  Per historical records, it was repaired in 766, received a donation of rice in 770, and suffered from extensive damage due to a storm in 775. The original temple was destroyed by a fire in 887, and although reconstructed, disappears from history by the end of the 12th century.

The site of the original temple has been known since antiquity, and forms a compound 230 meters east-to west by 205 meters north-to-south.  The foundations of the Kondō were discovered in 1916, and the site was extensively excavated from 1968 to 1979. The arrangement of buildings mirrored that of Hokki-ji in Ikaruga, Nara, with the Kondō in the west and the Pagoda in the east, both of which were in a courtyard formed by the cloister which connected the Lecture Hall with the Middle Gate. This deviated from the standard layout of most kokubunji temples, and indicates that probability that the foundation of this temple was from before the establishment of the kokubunji system.

The present temple was founded in 1615 just to the north of the ancient ruins. The temple's honzon, a seated Yakushi Nyōrai statue is 3.04 meters tall and was caved from a single block of keyaki wood. Temple legend states that this statue was carved by the famed priest Gyōki in the Nara period, but stylistically, this statue dates from the late 11th century and was extensively repaired in the Edo period. It is a national Important Cultural Property of Japan.

Numerous roof tiles were recovered from the site, and the kilns where these tiles were made has been located in the hills to the northeast of the temple ruins. The site of these kilns was included within the National Historic Site designation in 1921. As this site is a rare completely intact example of a kokubunji, the National Historic Site designation was expanded in 1971 and again in 1974. A museum was opened on the site by Ōgaki city in 1982.  The entire site was opened to the public as an archaeological park in 2007. It is located a 20-minute walk from the  "Inaba Danchi"  stop on the Meihan Kintetsu Bus from Ogaki Station on the JR East Tōkaidō Main Line.

Gallery

See also
List of Historic Sites of Japan (Gifu)
provincial temple

References

External links

 
Gifu prefecture official site
Ogaki city home page

Buddhist temples in Gifu Prefecture
Historic Sites of Japan
Ōgaki
Mino Province
Important Cultural Properties of Japan
8th-century establishments in Japan
Nara period
8th-century Buddhist temples
Kōyasan Shingon temples
Religious organizations established in the 8th century
Buddhist archaeological sites in Japan